Shai Alexander (17 January 1979 in Donetsk, Ukraine) is a Ukrainian-born Australian actor.

Shai currently resides in Sydney, New South Wales. He was trained in screen acting at the National Institute of Dramatic Art.

Education 
In 2002 Shai Alexander graduated from the University of Amsterdam in the Netherlands.

In 2010 he graduated from the National Institute of Dramatic Art (NIDA) studying at Screen Acting.

In 2013 Alexander started studying at the Screen Academy of the Russian Director and Actor Nikita Mikhalkov (Academy Award winner) in Moscow, Russia.

Filmography
 2012 – Socio ... as Businessman
 2011 – Newton's 3rd Law ... Sabir Ali
 2011 – Little Thief ... Vasse
 2010 – What If ... Alex Romero
 2010 – Take, Me, There ... Jack
 2010 – Before the Rain ... Danny
 2009 – Nicky Two-Tone ... Danny

References

External links
 
 Shai Alexander. Biography. IMDb
 

1979 births
Ukrainian emigrants to Australia
Male actors from Sydney
Living people

National Institute of Dramatic Art alumni
University of Amsterdam alumni